Elias II served as Greek Patriarch of Alexandria between 1171 and 1175.

References

12th-century Patriarchs of Alexandria